Fabrizio De Simone (born 30 March 1971) is an Italian racing driver. In 1996 he was f1 test driver in Jordan F1 Team. The following year he moved to Touring Car and he drove for three years with BMW in Italian Superturismo Championship.

Racing record

Complete Italian Touring Car Championship results
(key) (Races in bold indicate pole position) (Races in italics indicate fastest lap)

References

1971 births
Living people
Italian racing drivers
International Formula 3000 drivers

Karting World Championship drivers
BMW M drivers
AF Corse drivers
FIA GT Championship drivers